Mansel Passmore House is a historic home located in East Fallowfield Township, Chester County, Pennsylvania. It was built about 1830, and is a two-story, four bay, stuccoed stone Federal style dwelling.  It features an elliptical fanlight over the offcentered main entrance.

It was added to the National Register of Historic Places in 1985.

References

Houses on the National Register of Historic Places in Pennsylvania
Federal architecture in Pennsylvania
Houses completed in 1830
Houses in Chester County, Pennsylvania
1830 establishments in Pennsylvania
National Register of Historic Places in Chester County, Pennsylvania